Elizabeth M. Tamposi (born 1955) is an American former politician and diplomat who served as United States Assistant Secretary of State for Consular Affairs from October 18, 1989 until November 10, 1992.

Biography
Elizabeth M. Tamposi was born in Nashua, New Hampshire on February 13, 1955, the daughter of Nashua real estate developer Samuel A. Tamposi. She earned a B.A. from the University of New Hampshire, and a Master of Public Administration in 1984 and Master of Theological Studies in 2010 from Harvard University.

After college, Tamposi worked for Tamposi Company, her father's real estate company, eventually becoming vice president and partner. She later became president and sole shareholder of Hollis Crossing Realty, Inc., a real estate marketing and sales company.

Tamposi served in the New Hampshire House of Representatives from 1979 to 1986, chairing the House Ways and Means Committee and implementing a rainy day fund for the state.

During the 1988 congressional election, Tamposi sought election to the United States House of Representatives from New Hampshire, but lost the Republican primary, largely due to her opponent's assertions that it would be inappropriate for a mother of young children to leave the home and hold political office. On August 4, 1989, President of the United States George H. W. Bush nominated Tamposi as Assistant Secretary of State for Consular Affairs; after Senate confirmation, she held this office from October 18, 1989 until November 10, 1992. As Assistant Secretary, Tamposi travelled to 70 countries to assist Americans in need, and implemented measures to make the visa and passport application process more efficient.

Tamposi resigned a week after the 1992 U.S. presidential election of November 3, 1992, amidst allegations that she had abused her position as head of the Bureau of Consular Affairs, the bureau responsible for issuing United States passports. According to Tamposi, on September 28, 1992, she was contacted by Acting Assistant Secretary of State for Legislative Affairs Stephen K. Berry contacted her on behalf of the White House, asking her to search the consular records for a purported letter in which Democratic presidential candidate Bill Clinton either renounced his U.S. citizenship, or sought information about how to go about renouncing it, during his Vietnam War protest days in the late 1960s. Tamposi directed her subordinates to make such a search. She also later ordered a search of the passport records of third party candidate Ross Perot. When these searches were made public, Acting United States Secretary of State Lawrence Eagleburger fired Tamposi as Assistant Secretary of State for Consular Affairs on November 10, 1992. Tamposi argued that her superiors in the United States Department of State were aware of these requests and that she was being unfairly singled out for her role in the scandal.

Tamposi's name was later cleared of any wrongdoing and President Bush wrote her a hand-written apology stating that she is of "good character."

From 2005 to 2011, Tamposi was a member of the Board of Governors of the University of New Hampshire.

References

1955 births
United States Assistant Secretaries of State
Living people
People from Nashua, New Hampshire
University of New Hampshire alumni
Harvard Divinity School alumni
New Hampshire Republicans
American women diplomats
American diplomats
American people of Romanian descent
Harvard Kennedy School alumni
21st-century American women